Gagnoa Department is a department of Gôh Region in Gôh-Djiboua District, Ivory Coast. In 2021, its population was 724,496 and its seat is the settlement of Gagnoa. The sub-prefectures of the department are Bayota, Dahiépa-Kéhi, Dignago, Dougroupalégnaoa, Doukouyo, Gagnoa, Galebre-Galébouo, Gnagbodougnoa, Guibéroua, Ouragahio, Sérihio, and Yopohué.

History

Gagnoa Department was created in 1969 as one of the 24 new departments that were created to take the place of the six departments that were being abolished. It was created from territory that was formerly part of Centre-Ouest Department. Using current boundaries as a reference, from 1969 to 1980 the department occupied the same territory as Gôh Region.

In 1980, Gagnoa Department was divided to create Oumé Department. In 1997, regions were introduced as new first-level subdivisions of Ivory Coast; as a result, all departments were converted into second-level subdivisions. Gagnoa Department was initially included in Haut-Sassandra Region, but in 2000 it was combined with Oumé Department to form the new Fromager Region.

In October 2005, Gagnoa Department was the base of Bangladeshi UNOCI troops aiming to secure the proposed presidential elections in the country.

In 2011, districts were introduced as new first-level subdivisions of Ivory Coast. At the same time, regions were reorganised and became second-level subdivisions and all departments were converted into third-level subdivisions. At this time, Gagnoa Department became part of Gôh Region in Gôh-Djiboua District.

Demographics
The population of the department is predominantly from the Bété and Gagu ethnic groups.

Transport
The department is served by Gagnoa Airport.

Notes

Departments of Gôh
1969 establishments in Ivory Coast
States and territories established in 1969